Live on Ten Legs is a live album by American rock band Pearl Jam released on January 17, 2011. Composed of songs recorded during the band's 2003–2010 world tours, it is a companion piece to their 1998 live album, Live on Two Legs. All songs were remixed by longtime Pearl Jam engineer, Brett Eliason.

The album packaging is similar to the previous official live compilation. Photos of the band in concert are featured on the inside of the cover. A gatefold opens to reveal photos of the road crew and full colour reproductions of various concert posters from the band's tours of this era.

Critical reception
Live on Ten Legs earned generally positive reviews. "Inevitably, it's the old favourites that elicit the biggest cheers and carry greatest power…" wrote Paul Elliott in Classic Rock. "But this is an album full of great songs and great performances, confirming Vedder as one of the finest singers of his generation, and Pearl Jam as one of the truly iconic rock 'n' roll bands."

The album has been described as "well-produced", but at the same time lacking a real "live feel": the album has been described as having a very studio-like sound.

Track listing

Personnel
Pearl Jam
 Jeff Ament – bass guitar; backing vocals  (1, 4, 9); audio and visual concept
 Matt Cameron – drums; backing vocals  (2, 4, 7, 9, 12)
 Stone Gossard – rhythm guitar; backing vocals  (on "Rearviewmirror")
 Mike McCready – lead guitar; backing vocals  (1, 4, 9)
 Eddie Vedder – lead vocals; rhythm guitar  (6, 7, 8, 12, 16)

Additional musician and production
 Boom Gaspar – Hammond organ, keyboards
 John Burton – recording
 Brett Eliason – mixing
 Ed Brooks – mastering
 Regan Hagar – design
 Karen Loria - photos
 Lance Mercer – back cover photo

Charts

References

External links
 

2011 live albums
Pearl Jam live albums
Monkeywrench Records live albums
Self-released albums